The A4260 is a road that leads from the A422 Henneff Way, Banbury to Frieze Way near Oxford.

History

Romans
The route followed by the road is that of a prehistoric ridgeway between the valleys of the rivers Cherwell and Evenlode. The Romans adopted the route and paved it from north of Oxford as far as Akeman Street at Sturdy's Castle.

Medieval period & turnpiking 
The route remained in use through the medieval period, being described by John Ogilby in 1675 as the primary way between Oxford and Banbury. In the 18th century the route was turnpiked.

Post-1922 road lists
Until 1990 the road was part of the A423 and the major route from Banbury to Oxford.  It was renumbered to encourage the traffic that formerly used this route to use the M40.

References

External links
Highlighted Route of the A4260 on Google Maps

Roads in England
Roads in Oxfordshire